Frank William "Bill, Flash" Hollett (April 13, 1911 – April 20, 1999) was a Canadian professional ice hockey defenceman who played 13 seasons in the National Hockey League for the Toronto Maple Leafs, Ottawa Senators, Boston Bruins and Detroit Red Wings. Hollett was born in North Sydney, Nova Scotia, but grew up in Toronto, Ontario.

Playing career
Hollett was first noticed by Maple Leafs owner Conn Smythe as he was playing lacrosse with Lionel Conacher.  He apprenticed in the minor leagues before being loaned to the Senators for the 1933–34 NHL season.  After that - which was the original Senators' final season in Ottawa - Hollett played for the Leafs for a season and a half before being sold to the Bruins for $16,000, at the time one of the highest prices ever paid for a player.

Known for his swift skating stride and strong puckhandling ability, Hollett became one of the top offensive defencemen of his day.  He played for eight seasons in Boston, and was a star defenceman on the Bruins' Stanley Cup championship teams of 1939 and 1941.  In 1942, he set a record for goals by a defenceman with 19, a mark he tied the following season, after which he was named to the league's Second All-Star Team.

Hollett was traded to the Red Wings midseason in 1944, and the following year broke his own mark for goals in a season by a defenceman with 20 en route to a citation on the league's First All-Star Team; this record would stand for a quarter-century before being surpassed by Bobby Orr.

Retirement
After his record-setting season, Hollett's offensive numbers declined sharply in 1946, with the previously war-depleted NHL regaining many former stars.  In the wake of an acrimonious contract dispute with Detroit general manager Jack Adams, he was traded to the New York Rangers, but following his wife's wishes to live closer to home in Ontario, Hollett retired from the NHL.

He played for five more seasons in senior leagues, most notably for the Toronto Marlboros, which he led to the Allan Cup in 1950, his last in organized hockey.  He coached the Marlboros for a single season in 1951, recording a 19–12–1 record.

Hollett retired having scored 132 goals and 181 assists for 313 points in 565 NHL games; at the time of his retirement, he was the highest scoring defenceman in league history. In 79 NHL playoff games, he added 8 goals and 26 assists for 34 points.  Hollett was the last member of the original-era Ottawa Senators still active at the time of his retirement.

Career statistics

Regular season and playoffs

References

External links
 
Picture of 1941 Stanley Cup Plaque
 

1911 births
1999 deaths
Boston Bruins players
Canadian expatriate ice hockey players in the United States
Canadian ice hockey defencemen
Canadian people of English descent
Detroit Red Wings captains
Detroit Red Wings players
Hershey Bears players
Ice hockey people from Nova Scotia
Ottawa Senators (1917) players
Ottawa Senators (original) players
People from North Sydney, Nova Scotia
Sportspeople from the Cape Breton Regional Municipality
Ice hockey people from Toronto
Stanley Cup champions
Syracuse Stars (IHL) players
Toronto Maple Leafs players